Barka is a village in the Municipality of Divača in the Littoral region of Slovenia.

The local church is dedicated to Saint Cantianius and belongs to the Parish of Vatovlje.

References

External links

Barka on Geopedia

Populated places in the Municipality of Divača